Annunciation is a 1575–1576 oil on canvas painting of the Annunciation by El Greco, one of the earliest paintings by the artist. It is now part of the Thyssen-Bornemisza Museum, in Madrid.

Bibliography
 José Álvarez Lopera, El Greco, Madrid, Arlanza, 2005, Biblioteca «Descubrir el Arte», (colección «Grandes maestros»). .
 Michael Scholz-Hänsel, El Greco, Colonia, Taschen, 2003. .

External links

Paintings by El Greco
1576 paintings
El Greco
Paintings in the Thyssen-Bornemisza Museum